Michael Maloney (born 19 June 1957) is an English actor.

Life and career
Born in Bury St. Edmunds, Suffolk, Maloney's first television appearance was as Peter Barkworth's teenage son in the 1979 drama series Telford's Change.

He made his West End debut in 1979 in Can you Hear me at The Back, by Brian Clark, followed immediately by Taking Steps by Alan Ayckbourn. After playing Toby Gashe in The Bell, by Iris Murdoch, Maloney joined the Royal Shakespeare Company in 1982 playing Ferdinand in The Tempest. After the RSC, he went on to play in The Perfectionist at Hampstead, the title role of Peer Gynt for Cambridge Theatre Company, The London Cuckolds at the Lyric Hammersmith, Two Planks and a Passion by Anthony Minghella, directed by Danny Boyle at Greenwich and Built on Sand at the Royal Court. Maloney went on to appear in many films and television series, including What if Its Raining, by Anthony Minghella, for Channel 4. He became a familiar face after playing the Dauphin in  Kenneth Branagh's 1989 film adaptation of Henry V. In the early 1990s, he played Prince Hal in Henry IV Parts 1 and 2, Romeo in Romeo and Juliet for the RSC and Hamlet on a national tour starting at Greenwich. He appeared on television in Mr Wakefield's Crusade, on film as Mark in Truly, Madly, Deeply, and in 1994 he took the lead in the BBC adaptation of Love on a Branch Line. He appeared in both the 1990 and 1996 film versions of Hamlet, as Rosencrantz and Laertes respectively, and in several other Shakespeare screen adaptations, including the lead role in In the Bleak Midwinter by Kenneth Branagh. In addition to his TV appearances, he starred as Jason Fields in the film American Reel in 1999. 2002 saw him play Brian Albumen, personal aide to Rik Mayall's Adonis Cnut character in the Gran and Marks penned TV sitcom Believe Nothing. In 2003, he appeared as the Belgian Prosper Profond in The Forsyte Saga. In the theatre he played Hamlet again for Yukio Ninagawa on tour and at the Barbican. He played Cassius in the 2005 miniseries Empire, John Major in 2009's Margaret and Prime Minister Sir Robert Peel in the 2009 film The Young Victoria.

He is active in radio drama on BBC Radio 4, playing the Dean in both series of High Table, Lower Orders and Giles the gossip columnist in His Master's Voice. He has made a guest appearance in the BBC Radio 4 series Baldi. He has also appeared in a Bollywood films Kisna, and  I See You, playing the detective inspector. 

In 2010, he appeared in long-running drama Casualty as consultant Howard Fairfax, and in series 4 of the political satire series The Thick of It, he played Matthew Hodge, part of the Goolding Inquiry. In 2013, he portrayed Sir Henry Stafford, third husband of Lady Margaret Beaufort, in the BBC TV series The White Queen. In 2016, he appeared in the ITV/Netflix series Paranoid. He was also in the second series of Utopia for Channel 4 and played Edward Heath in series 3 of The Crown. He most recently has a cameo role in Belfast, directed by Kenneth Branagh, and played the role of Vanya, in Vanya, Sonia, Masha and Spike, by Christopher Durang, directed by Walter Bobbie, at the Charing Cross Theatre.

He has recorded many audiobooks including Captain Corelli's Mandolin.

He has also lent his voice to various video game characters, including The Lost Soul in the 2013 video game Castlevania: Lords of Shadow - Mirror of Fate, Avallac'h in the 2015 video game The Witcher 3: Wild Hunt, and Doloran in the 2018 video game Ni no Kuni II: Revenant Kingdom.

Personal life

Maloney's father emigrated from County Cork, Ireland to Godalming, Surrey, UK.

In 2002, Maloney married Italian-American model and photographer Kim Andreolli;  Maloney and Andreolli had one child, a daughter, before divorcing.

Maloney lives in South London in Clapham.

He is an advocate for macrobiotic eating.

Selected filmography

Radio
 Troy, trilogy of radio plays written by Andrew Rissik and directed by Jeremy Mortimer – Hector
 Scenes of Seduction, radio play written by Timberlake Wertenbaker and directed by Ned Chaillet, broadcast on BBC Radio 4 7 Mar 2005 – Henry (King Henry V).
 Bran in Earthsearch II, James Follett's 1982 "new adventure serial in time and space" on BBC Radio 4.
 A Pair of Blue Eyes, adaptation of a novel by Thomas Hardy, BBC Radio 4 Extra, directed by Cherry Cookson.
 Lord Arthur Savile's Crime, BBC 7 2003. Produced in Manchester by Katherine Beacon.

References

External links
 

English male television actors
English male stage actors
English male Shakespearean actors
Male actors from Suffolk
1957 births
Living people
English male radio actors
English male film actors
Actors from Bury St Edmunds
Audiobook narrators
20th-century English male actors
21st-century English male actors